Nowa Kuźnia  is a village in the administrative district of Gmina Gromadka, within Bolesławiec County, Lower Silesian Voivodeship, in south-western Poland. 

References

Villages in Bolesławiec County